Travis Hunter could refer to:
 Travis Hunter (American football)
 Travis Hunter (writer)